The Philippine Senate Committee on Basic Education, Arts and Culture is a standing committee of the Senate of the Philippines.

This committee, along with the Committee on Higher, Technical and Vocational Education, was formed after the Committee on Education, Arts and Culture was split into two on July 31, 2019, pursuant to Senate Resolution No. 6 of the 18th Congress.

Jurisdiction 
According to the Rules of the Senate, the committee handles all matters relating to:

 Early childhood care and education, pre-school, kindergarten, primary and secondary education
 Science high schools except the Philippine Science High School System
 Teachers' and students' welfare, teacher education and competency
 Non-formal, informal, indigenous learning systems, special education and community adult education
 Inclusive education, scholarships, grants, subsidies and incentives to deserving students
 The national language
 The Department of Education
 Establishment and maintenance of libraries, museums, shrines, monuments, and other historical sites and edifices
 Training programs and cultural and artistic programs of international institutions and organizations operating in the Philippines, such as the UNESCO
 Preservation, enrichment and evolution of Filipino arts and culture

Members, 18th Congress 
Based on the Rules of the Senate, the Senate Committee on Basic Education, Arts and Culture has 15 members.

The President Pro Tempore, the Majority Floor Leader, and the Minority Floor Leader are ex officio members.

Here are the members of the committee in the 18th Congress as of September 24, 2020:

Committee secretary: Joey M. Tunac

See also 

 List of Philippine Senate committees

References 

Basic